Karbala refers to:

Places

Iraq
 Karbala, city in central Iraq

Iran
 Karbala, Iran
 Karbala, Fars
 Karbala, Zanjan

Turkey
 Karbala (Cappadocia)

India
 Karbala, India

Other
Karbala (film), 2015 Polish film
Karbala (song), a song by Zubeen Garg